Sa Piling ni Nanay is a 2016 Philippine television drama series broadcast by GMA Network. It premiered on the network's Afternoon Prime line up and worldwide via GMA Pinoy TV from June 27, 2016 to January 27, 2017, replacing The Millionaire's Wife.

Mega Manila, Urban Luzon, and NUTAM (Nationwide Urban Television Audience Measurement) ratings are provided by AGB Nielsen Philippines.

Series overview

Episodes

June 2016

July 2016

August 2016

September 2016

October 2016

November 2016

December 2016

January 2017

Episodes notes

References

Lists of Philippine drama television series episodes